Sexual inversion may refer to:
 Sexual inversion (sexology), a term for homosexuality found primarily in older scientific literature
 Sexual Inversion, a textbook by Havelock Ellis about homosexuality
 A metamorphic change in the gender of an animal
 A reversal in the normal sexual behavior of an animal, e.g. males being submissive, or females exhibiting mounting behavior

LGBT non-fiction books